Sharya  (also written Shariya) is a town located in the Simele District of the Dohuk Governorate in Kurdistan Region of Iraq. The town is located ca.  south of Dohuk.

Sharya is populated by Yazidis.

References

Populated places in Dohuk Province
Yazidi populated places in Iraq